Ted Berrigan (November 15, 1934 – July 4, 1983) was an American poet.

Early life
Berrigan was born in Providence, Rhode Island, on November 15, 1934. After high school, he spent a year at Providence College before joining the U.S. Army. After three years in the Army, he finished his college studies at the University of Tulsa in Oklahoma, where he received a B.A. in English in 1959 and fell just short of the requirements for an M.A. in 1962. Berrigan was married to Sandy Berrigan, also a poet, and they had two children: David Berrigan and Kate Berrigan. He founded "C" magazine in 1964. He and his second wife, the poet Alice Notley, were active in the poetry scene in Chicago for several years, then moved to New York City, where he edited various magazines and books.

The New York School
A prominent figure in the second generation of the New York School of Poets, Berrigan was peer to Jim Carroll, Anselm Hollo, Alice Notley, Ron Padgett, Anne Waldman, Bernadette Mayer, and Lewis Warsh. He collaborated with Padgett and Joe Brainard on Bean Spasms, a work significant in its rejection of traditional concepts of ownership. Though Berrigan, Padgett, and Brainard all wrote individual poems for the book, and collaborated on many others, no authors were listed for individual poems.

In 2005, Berrigan's published and unpublished poetry was published together in a single volume edited by the poet Alice Notley, Berrigan's second wife, and their two sons, Anselm Berrigan, a poet, and Edmund Berrigan, a poet and songwriter.

The Sonnets
The poet Frank O'Hara called Berrigan's most significant publication, The Sonnets, "a fact of modern poetry."  A telling reflection of the era that produced it, The Sonnets beautifully weaves together traditional elements of the Shakespearean sonnet form with the disjunctive structure and cadence of T. S. Eliot's The Waste Land and Berrigan's own literary innovations and personal experiences. In the words of Berrigan's editor and second wife Alice Notley, the product was a composition "[that is] musical, sexy, and funny."

Berrigan was initially drawn to the sonnet form because of its inherent challenge; in his own words, "the form sort of [stultifies] the whole process [of writing]."  The procedure that he ultimately concocted to write The Sonnets is the essence of the work's novelty and ingenuity.  After attempting several sonnets, Berrigan decided to go back through what he had written and take out certain lines, one line from each work until he had six lines. He then went through the poems backwards and took one more line from each until he had accumulated six more lines, twelve lines total. Based on this body of the work, Berrigan knew what the final couplet would be; this process became the basis for The Sonnets.  Addressing claims that the method is utterly mechanical, Berrigan explains that some of the seventy-seven sonnets came to him "whole," without needing to be pieced together.  The poet's preoccupation with style, his concern for form and his own role as the creator, as evinced by The Sonnets, pose a challenge to traditional ideas about poetry and signify a fresh and innovative artistic approach.

The book recognizes the eternal possibility for invention in a genre seemingly overwhelmed by the success of its traditional forms.  By imitating the forms and practices of earlier artists and recreating them to express personal ideas and experiences, Berrigan demonstrates the potential for poetry in his and subsequent generations.  As Charles Bernstein succinctly comments, "Part collage, part process writing, part sprung lyric, Ted Berrigan's The Sonnets remains…one of the freshest and most buoyantly inspired works of contemporary poetry.  Reinventing verse for its time, The Sonnets are redolent with possibilities for our own.”

Death
Berrigan died on July 4, 1983 of cirrhosis of the liver brought on by hepatitis.

Selected publications
The Sonnets (1964, 1967, 1982, 2000) 
Seventeen Plays, with Ron Padgett (1964)
Living With Chris (1965)
Some Things (1966)
Bean Spasms, with Ron Padgett and Joe Brainard (1967) 
Many Happy Returns (1969)
Peace: Broadside (1969)
In the Early Morning Rain (1971)
Memorial Day, with Anne Waldman (1971)
Back in Boston Again, with Ron Padgett and Tom Clark (1972)
The Drunken Boat (1974)
A Feeling For Leaving (1975)
Red Wagon (1976)
Clear The Range (1977)
Nothing For You (1977)
Train Ride (1978)
Yo-Yo's With Money, with Harris Schiff (1979)
Carrying a Torch (1980)
So Going Around Cities: New & Selected Poems 1958–1979 (1980)
In a Blue River (1981)
A Certain Slant of Sunlight (1988)
Selected Poems (1994)
Great Stories of the Chair (1998)
The Collected Poems of Ted Berrigan (University of California Press, 2005) NOH (1969)
 Get the Money!: Collected Prose (1961-1983), a collection of prose published by City Lights Books. 09/13/2022. .

Further reading
Clark, Tom. Late Returns, a Memoir of Ted Berrigan (Tombouctou Books, 1985)  
Waldman, Anne. Nice To See You: Homage to Ted Berrigan (Coffee House Press, 1991) 
GAS #3 (Ted Berrigan Issue) Tom Clark [editor] (1991): includes contributions by Charles Bukowski, Alice Notley, Anne Waldman, Anselm Hollo, Bill Berkson, Annie Laurie, Jim Carroll, Eileen Myles, Joe Brainard, Owen Hill, Tom Veitch, Ron Padgett, Steve Carey, Clark Coolidge, et al.)

References

External links

EPC author page
PennSound page
Bohemian Ink: Ted Berrigan
Academy of American Poets: Ted Berrigan
Berrigan in Chicago
Jacket: Essay on The Sonnets
Ted Berrigan and Alice Notley collection at Stuart A. Rose Manuscript, Archives, and Rare Book Library, Emory University 
Finding aid to Ted Berrigan papers at Columbia University. Rare Book & Manuscript Library.

1934 births
1983 deaths
Writers from Providence, Rhode Island
Poets from Rhode Island
Writers from New York City
Writers from Chicago
Poets from Oklahoma
Writers from Tulsa, Oklahoma
New York School poets
Iowa Writers' Workshop faculty
Deaths from cirrhosis
20th-century American poets
American male poets
20th-century American male writers